Anton Heiden (born July 4, 1960 in Barendrecht) is a former water polo player from the Netherlands

Heiden participated once with the Dutch national water polo team at the Olympics, finishing in sixth position at the 1984 Summer Olympics in Los Angeles. He played at various clubs, amongst them: ZPB Barendrecht and Zian Den Haag. After his career as a player he became a water polo coach. Currently he's the head coach of ZDHC Den Haag.

References
 Dutch Olympic Committee
 
 

1960 births
Living people
Dutch male water polo players
Olympic water polo players of the Netherlands
Water polo players at the 1984 Summer Olympics
Sportspeople from Barendrecht
20th-century Dutch people